Wolfgang Platzeck (born 3 March 1944) is a German former swimmer. He competed in the men's 200 metre butterfly at the 1964 Summer Olympics.

References

External links
 

1944 births
Living people
German male swimmers
Olympic swimmers of the United Team of Germany
Swimmers at the 1964 Summer Olympics
People from Greiz
German male butterfly swimmers
Sportspeople from Thuringia
20th-century German people
21st-century German people